The 2010–11 season was the club's 102nd season, having been founded as Dundee Hibernian in 1909 and their 13th consecutive season in the Scottish Premier League, having competed in it since its inauguration in 1998–99. United also competed in the League Cup and the Scottish Cup.

Results & fixtures

Friendlies
The club continued their tradition of participating in the Keyline Cup, visiting Oban in mid July to win the tournament they previously won in 2008. United have confirmed five pre-season friendlies, travelling to Austria for a small pre-season tour and visiting Irish side Glentoran and Championship side Hull City at the end of July. In August, FA Premier League side Wigan Athletic will visit Tannadice for the final pre-season friendly.

SPL
Dundee United began their SPL campaign on Saturday 14 August against St Mirren at St Mirren Park.

Scottish Cup

Scottish League Cup

UEFA Europa League
Dundee United entered the UEFA Europa League at the play-off round taking on AEK Athens.

Team statistics

League table

Playing kit

The playing kit is sponsored for the first time by Calor Gas. Nike continued with the second year of their four-year deal of kit production. Dundee-based cosmetic car repair specialists Dents8 entered the second year of their two-year sponsorship of the home and away shorts and the first team's socks.

References

Dundee United F.C. seasons
Dundee United